Rear Admiral Norman von Heldreich Farquhar (April 11, 1840 – July 3, 1907) was an officer in the United States Navy during the American Civil War. He is best known for commanding a naval squadron which was wrecked with three German warships at Apia, Samoa, in 1889.

Biography
After graduating from the Naval Academy in June 1859, he served with the Africa Squadron until September 1861 when he sailed a prize slaver home to the United States.

At the close of the war, he was executive officer of the gunboat . He was promoted to the rank of lieutenant commander in August 1865, a few months after the fighting ended, and was on duty at the U.S. Naval Academy from then until September 1868. For the rest of the 1860s and into the next decade, Farquhar served in the screw sloop , was executive officer of the sloop  and the frigate , and commanding officer of the gunboat . He also had two tours at the Boston Navy Yard on ordnance duty and as executive officer.

Advanced in rank to commander in December 1872, Farquhar spent nearly five years at the Naval Academy. Five more years of Naval Academy duty were followed by torpedo instruction at Newport, Rhode Island, in 1886. From May 1887 until her loss in the March 1889 Samoan hurricane, Captain Farquhar commanded the steam frigate . Farquhar was commended for his fine handling of his ship during that disastrous 1889 hurricane at Apia, Samoa, in which she and a number of other American and foreign naval vessels were lost.

He then served on several of the Navy's boards and, in March 1890 became the chief of the Bureau of Yards and Docks. During 1894–97, he was commandant of the Philadelphia Navy Yard, commanding officer of the cruiser , and president of the Naval Examining Board.

While holding the ranks of commodore and rear admiral, Farquhar was commandant of the Norfolk Navy Yard in 1897–99, commanded the North Atlantic Squadron during 1899–1901 and was chairman of the Lighthouse Board in 1901–02.

Admiral Farquhar was a companion of the Military Order of the Loyal Legion of the United States (insignia number 9937) and a member of the Naval Order of the United States.

Rear Admiral Farquhar retired on April 11, 1902, and died at Jamestown, Rhode Island, on July 3, 1907. Farquhar was buried in Section 1 of Arlington National Cemetery. His wife, Addie Whelan Pope Farquhar (1845–1909), is buried with him.

Namesake

Two ships have been named  for him.

The Farquhar Glacier in Greenland was named after him by Robert Peary.

Notes

References

External links
 

1840 births
1907 deaths
United States Navy rear admirals (upper half)
United States Naval Academy alumni
Union Navy officers
People of Pennsylvania in the American Civil War
Burials at Arlington National Cemetery